"She's Like the Wind" is a 1987 song by American actor and singer Patrick Swayze from the soundtrack to the film Dirty Dancing. The song features additional vocals from singer Wendy Fraser. The ballad reached number three on the US Billboard Hot 100 and number one on the Adult Contemporary chart.

Production
Swayze and Stacy Widelitz co-wrote the song in 1984. It was originally intended for the soundtrack of Grandview, U.S.A. and was meant to be about Jamie Lee Curtis' character in the film. However, the song was not used in that film. During production of Dirty Dancing in 1987, Swayze played the demo for producer Linda Gottlieb and director Emile Ardolino. They loved it and passed it on to Jimmy Ienner and Bob Feiden, the soundtrack's executive producers. It was recorded for the soundtrack in November 1986, with Michael Lloyd producing. The song, like the film in which it was featured, was a success, reaching number three on the Billboard Hot 100 and number one on Adult Contemporary, and was a hit around the world. It is still in rotation on radio. The soundtrack album was number one for 18 weeks.

During his appearance on the August 7, 2020 episode of the podcast The Joe Rogan Experience, actor Rob Lowe mentions that Swayze tried to shop the song to the producers of Lowe's 1986 film, Youngblood for inclusion on its soundtrack, but the song was rejected.

Music video

The music video in black and white features clips from the movie Dirty Dancing. The video can be seen on the Ultimate Dirty Dancing DVD.

Releases
The song was released commercially on 7" vinyl in many countries, with a 3-track 12" maxi single and 2-track cassette also produced. CD singles were a relatively new format, however; a 2 and 3-track 5" CD and Japanese mini CD single were commercially released.

Track listing

Personnel
Patrick Swayze - Lead vocals
Wendy Fraser - Harmony and co-lead vocals
Laurence Juber - Guitar
Gary Herbig - Saxophone
Dennis Belfield - Bass
Paul Leim - Drums
Stacy Widelitz - Oberheim OB-8 synthesizer

Charts

Weekly charts

Year-end charts

Certifications

Cover versions

Lumidee and Tony Sunshine version

American recording artists Lumidee and Tony Sunshine covered the song for Lumidee's second album, Unexpected (2007). It was released as the lead single from Unexpected in the US and Europe on April 3, 2007.

Background
According to Lumidee, the idea to record a remake of Patrick Swayze's 1987 song "She's Like The Wind" was inspired by her European label when she recommended a collaboration with recording artist Tony Sunshine. She also said, "We'd been talking about working together but hadn't been able to. But he loved the idea of doing something with this song."

Music video
The music video for this version was directed by Dayo.

Track listing
"She's Like the Wind" (radio edit) – 4:17
"She's Like the Wind" (Spanglish version) – 3:53
"She's Like the Wind" (instrumental) – 4:18
"She's Like the Wind" (a cappella) – 4:15

Charts

Notes

References

1987 singles
1992 singles
2007 singles
Patrick Swayze songs
Lumidee songs
Songs from Dirty Dancing
Song recordings produced by Michael Lloyd
1980s ballads
Rock ballads
American soft rock songs
TVT Records singles
1987 songs
RCA Records singles
Black-and-white music videos